Pure is a compilation album by pop band The Lightning Seeds, released in 1996 and reaching #27 in the UK Albums Chart.

The first of what would turn out to be five compilations Ian Broudie released from 1996 to 2006, Pure, The Lightning Seeds' first release by Virgin, is almost a reissue rather than a compilation, since it consists of all but three of the songs released by Epic on the first two albums, Cloudcuckooland from 1990 and Sense from 1992; the only songs missing are one song from the first album ("Control the Flame") and two from Sense: ("Where Flowers Fade" and "Marooned").

Track listing

Tracks 1, 2, 3, 7, 12, 13, 14, 18 from Sense
Tracks 4, 5, 6, 8, 9, 10, 11, 15, 16, 17 from Cloudcuckooland

Charts

Certifications
 United Kingdom (BPI): Silver (1 January 1997)

References

The Lightning Seeds albums
Albums produced by Ian Broudie
1996 compilation albums
Virgin Records compilation albums